Manhasset is a station on the Long Island Rail Road's Port Washington Branch in Manhasset, New York. It is 17.2 miles (27.7 km) from Penn Station in Midtown Manhattan.

Despite the line consisting of only a single track east of Great Neck, more parking spaces are available than at other nearby stations on the line, hence many commuters who do not live in Manhasset use it.

History 
Though a smaller wooden structure was originally built in 1899, the current station was built in the 1920s in a trench, at Plandome Road and Maple Place, off Park Avenue, five blocks North of Northern Boulevard. A high-level platform was installed in the 1970s. 

Manhasset station was built by the Great Neck and Port Washington Railroad in 1899, the year after the Manhasset Viaduct was completed. It was the penultimate station along the branch until Plandome station was built to the northeast in 1909. 

The station was rebuilt in 1924 in the Dutch-colonial style typical of stations such as Riverhead, Bay Shore, Northport, and Mineola, and restored between 1999 and 2001 with the addition of more canopies and staircases.

Station layout
The station has one 10-car long side platform on the south side of the track.

References

External links
 

Manhasset, New York
Railway stations in the United States opened in 1899
Long Island Rail Road stations in Nassau County, New York
1899 establishments in New York (state)